Jamia Shariyah Malibagh ( Arabic: الجامعة الشرعية ماليباغ), also known as Jamia Shariyah Madrasa, is one of the established Qawmi jamiahs in Dhaka, Bangladesh.

History
A musalli Golam Gouse donated his land to set up this mosque in 1956. Later they established a small Maktab and the name of the Maktab was "Furkqania Maktab". Day by day this Maktab improved as "Tahfizul Qur'an" and later as 'Kitab' faculty and in 1982 this institution started Daura Hadith (the highest certificate course of Madrasa education system), by the help of local people and endless labor of scholars and teachers. From the very beginning, the students of this Madrasa is doing repellent result including place in the board exam. To the light of board exam, this Jamiah is one of the best Madrasahs in Bangladesh.

Departments and divisions

 Department of Ifta (Islamic Law)
 Masters/Daura Hadith
 Degree
 Higher secondary
 Secondary level
 Primary Level
 Tahfizul Quran
 Maktab
 Outdoor Maktab
 Residential Maktab

Notable people
Qazi Mu'tasim Billah (1933–2013), longtime principal

References

External links
 Official Tarana of Jamia Shariyyah Malibagh

Qawmi madrasas of Bangladesh
Deobandi Islamic universities and colleges
Islamic universities and colleges in Bangladesh
1956 establishments in East Pakistan
Islam in Dhaka